Autophysiopsychic is an album by American multi-instrumentalist and composer Yusef Lateef recorded in 1977 and released on the CTI label.  The record was recorded in October 1977 at Electric Lady Studios in New York, United States.

Reception
The Allmusic review stated "Autophysiopsychic is probably the single album that many Yusef Lateef fans either love or hate the most... five fat slices of original funk that have far more in common with the sounds of Chocolate City than with the bop sounds of 52nd Street. Autophysiopsychic is awash in the soft soul-funk-jazz sound typical of Creed Taylor's (CTI) productions in the 1970s... Not the most typical album in Lateef's wide-ranging catalog, but certainly the most fun".

Track listing
All compositions by Yusef Lateef except as indicated
 "Robot Man" - 6:39 
 "Look on the Right Side" - 5:10 
 "Yl" (David Matthews) - 7:58 
 "Communication" - 9:23 
 "Sister Mamie" - 10:06 
Recorded at Electric Lady Studios in New York City on October 19, 20 & 21, 1977

Personnel
Yusef Lateef - flute, tenor saxophone, soprano saxophone, shehnai, vocals
Art Farmer - flugelhorn
Clifford Carter - keyboards
Eric Gale - electric guitar
Gary King - electric bass
Jim Madison - drums 
Sue Evans - percussion
Frank Floyd, Babi Floyd, Milt Grayson, Norberto Jones - backing vocals
David Matthews - arranger

References

CTI Records albums
Yusef Lateef albums
1977 albums
Albums produced by Creed Taylor
Albums arranged by David Matthews (keyboardist)
Albums recorded at Electric Lady Studios